Hornberg  is the name of the following geographic objects:
 Hornberg, town in Ortenaukreis, Baden-Württemberg

Villages
 Hornberg (Altensteig), borough of Altensteig, county of Calw, Baden-Württemberg
 Hornberg (Cappel), village in the borough of Öhringen-Cappel, Hohenlohekreis, Baden-Württemberg, see Cappel (Öhringen)#History,
 Hornberg (Fichtenberg), village in the borough of Fichtenberg, Schwäbisch Hall, Baden-Württemberg
 Hornberg an der Jagst, part of Kirchberg an der Jagst, Schwäbisch Hall, Baden-Württemberg
 Hornberg (Herrischried), part of Herrischried, Waldshut, Baden-Württemberg
 Hornberg (Dimbach), village in Dimbach, Bezirk Perg, Upper Austria
 Hornberg (Höfen), village in Höfen, Bezirk Reutte, Tyrol
 Hornberg (Innervillgraten), village in Innervillgraten, Bezirk Lienz/East Tyrol, Tyrol
 Hornberg BE, region in the municipality of Saanen in the Swiss canton of Berne

Structures
 Hornberg Castle (Neckarzimmern), castle in Neckarzimmern, Neckar-Odenwald-Kreis, Baden-Württemberg
 Hornberg Castle (Öhringen), built-over castle site in Cappel-Hornberg (Öhringen), Hohenlohekreis, Baden-Württemberg
 Hornberg Castle (Hornberg an der Jagst), palace-like castle site in Hornberg an der Jagst (Kirchberg an der Jagst), Schwäbisch Hall, Baden-Württemberg
 Hornberg Castle (Schwarzwald), palace ruins near the town of  Hornberg, Ortenaukreis, Baden-Württemberg
 Althornberg Castle, castle site near Althornberg (Triberg im Schwarzwald), Schwarzwald-Baar-Kreis, Baden-Württemberg
 Hornberg Airfield, glider airfield on the Kalten Feld (Swabian Jura), near Degenfeld, Ostalbkreis, Baden-Württemberg

Hills (by height)
 Hornberg (Swabian Jura), 697.9 m, in the Swabian Jura, near Degenfeld (Schwäbisch Gmünd), Ostalbkreis, Baden-Württemberg
 Hornberg (Virngrund), 580.0 m, highest hill in the Virngrund, near Ellenberg, Ostalbkreis, Baden-Württemberg
 Hornberg (Frankenhöhe), 554.0 m, highest summit in the Frankenhöhe, near Schnelldorf, Ansbach, Bavaria
 Hornberg (Abtsgmünd), 495.7 m, near Abtsgmünd in the Jura Foreland, Ostalbkreis, Baden-Württemberg
 Hornberg (Dautphetal), 451.0 m, in the Damshäusen Kuppen, near Friedensdorf (Dautphetal), Marburg-Biedenkopf, Hesse
 Hornberg (Breisgau), 356.5 m, in the Breisgau, near Kollmarsreute (Emmendingen), Emmendingen, Baden-Württemberg
 Hornberg (Framersheim) (273.3 m), in the Alzey Hills, near Framersheim, Alzey-Worms, Rhineland-Palatinate

Surname
 House of Hornberg (Swabia), Swabian noble family
 House of Hornberg (Black Forest), noble family from the Black Forest valley of Gutach
 Horneck of Hornberg, noble family
 Antonia Hornberg (b 1991), German female footballer

See also
 Hornburg
 Hornberger